Giuliano Ceccoli (born 18 September 1949) is a Sammarinese sports shooter. He competed in the men's 10 metre air rifle event at the 1992 Summer Olympics.

References

1949 births
Living people
Sammarinese male sport shooters
Olympic shooters of San Marino
Shooters at the 1992 Summer Olympics
Place of birth missing (living people)